Euro gold and silver commemorative coins are special euro coins minted and issued by member states of the Eurozone, mainly in gold and silver, although other precious metals are also used in rare occasions. Slovenia introduced the euro (€) on 1 January 2007. Since then, the Bank of Slovenia have been issuing both normal issues of Slovenian euro coins, which are intended for circulation, and commemorative euro coins in gold and silver.

These special coins have a legal tender only in Slovenia, unlike the normal issues of the Slovenian euro coins, which have a legal tender in every country of the Eurozone. This means that the commemorative coins made of gold and silver cannot be used as money in other countries. Furthermore, as their bullion value generally vastly exceeds their face value, these coins are not intended to be used as means of payment at all—although it remains possible. For this reason, they are usually named Collectors' coins.

The coins usually commemorate the anniversaries of historical events or draw attention to current events of special importance. Slovenia has minted five of these coins in 2008, mainly in both gold and silver, with face value ranging from 3 to 100 euros.

Summary 

As of 24 December 2008, 5 variations of Slovenian commemorative coins have been minted, all of them in 2008; while another 5 are scheduled to be minted in 2009. These special high-value commemorative coins are not to be confused with €2 commemorative coins, which are coins designated for circulation and do have legal tender status in all countries of the Eurozone.

The following table shows the number of coins minted per year. In the first section, the coins are grouped by the metal used, while in the second section they are grouped by their face value.

2008 coinage

2009 coinage

2010 coinage

References

Slovenia
Currencies of Slovenia